Eduard von Lütcken (October 26, 1882 – September 15, 1914) was a German horse rider who competed in the 1912 Summer Olympics. He was part of the German team which won the silver medal in the equestrian team event.

He was killed in action during World War I.

See also
 List of Olympians killed in World War I

References

External links
profile

1882 births
1914 deaths
Equestrians at the 1912 Summer Olympics
Olympic equestrians of Germany
German male equestrians
Olympic silver medalists for Germany
German event riders
Olympic medalists in equestrian
German military personnel killed in World War I
Medalists at the 1912 Summer Olympics